"The Son of Hickory Holler's Tramp" is a song written by Dallas Frazier and first recorded by country musician, Johnny Darrell in 1968.

The song tells the story of a woman with 14 children who is abandoned by her worthless alcoholic husband and turns to prostitution to support her large family.

Recordings
It was a hit for O. C. Smith, who recorded it at FAME Studios in Muscle Shoals in 1968. His single spent 15 weeks in the UK Singles Chart between June and August 1968, including three weeks at No 2. In the US the single spent 14 weeks on the Billboard chart peaking at No 40.

Previous releases were by Sanford Clark, and by Johnny Darrell who made it in the Billboard Country Charts to No. 37. Merle Haggard released a version of this song on his 1968 album Sing Me Back Home. In 1977, the song became much better known in the US because it was included on Kenny Rogers' second solo album Kenny Rogers, which topped the U.S. Billboard magazine's Hot Country Songs chart.

References

1968 singles
Songs about prostitutes
Songs about alcohol
Songs written by Dallas Frazier
1968 songs
O. C. Smith songs
Merle Haggard songs